Alois Roppert (25 May 1934 – 15 September 2022) was an Austrian politician. A member of the Social Democratic Party of Austria, he served in the National Council from 1979 to 1994.

Roppert died on 15 September 2022 at the age of 88.

References

1934 births
2022 deaths
Social Democratic Party of Austria politicians
Members of the National Council (Austria)
People from Carinthia (state)